James "Jim" J. O'Day (born May 23, 1954 in Worcester) is an American social worker and politician in the Massachusetts House of Representatives.

Career
Born and raised in Worcester, O'Day attended Worcester Academy, then received his Bachelor of Science degree in urban studies and management from Worcester State University in 1983. After college, O'Day became a social worker for the Commonwealth of Massachusetts Department of Social Services, where he worked for 24 years.

In 2007, O'Day ran in a special election to represent the 14th Worcester district in the Massachusetts House of Representatives. He won the election in April 2007 and was sworn in the following month. He is also a member of the Steering, Policy, and Scheduling Committee.

Personal life
O'Day is married to Marybeth Murphy, with whom he has four sons: Tyler, Max, Patrick, and Kevin. The family resides in West Boylston, Massachusetts.

See also
 2019–2020 Massachusetts legislature
 2021–2022 Massachusetts legislature

References

External links
 Commonwealth of Massachusetts profile

1954 births
Living people
Politicians from Worcester, Massachusetts
People from West Boylston, Massachusetts
Worcester Academy alumni
Worcester State University alumni
American social workers
Democratic Party members of the Massachusetts House of Representatives
21st-century American politicians